Jagat Rawat is an Indian film and television actor from a strong theatre background, including his six years in  Bhartendu Academy of Dramatic Arts and National School of Drama repertory company, where he acted in many classic and contemporary plays. He is currently portraying Ashutosh Nanavati in Pushpa Impossible.

He has worked in films like Commando - A One Man Army, Ab Tak Chhappan 2, Manjhi - The Mountain Man and many more.

Filmography

Films

Television

References

External links

21st-century Indian male actors
Indian male film actors
Indian male television actors
Male actors in Hindi cinema
Indian television presenters
Living people
1974 births
Bharatendu Academy of Dramatic Arts alumni